The Old LA Certified Farmers Market (OLA CFM) operates in the Highland Park neighborhood of Los Angeles, CA. The farmers market is open every Tuesday from 3 p.m. to dusk, year round. One of the newest certified farmers markets in the Los Angeles area, the OLA CFM opened in April 2006 and serves Highland Park and other neighborhoods in northeast Los Angeles, including Mt. Washington, Eagle Rock, Glassell Park, and Montecito Heights. The OLA CFM is of moderate size, with about 10 participating farmers. The market is located in the "downtown" center of Northeast Los Angeles, adjacent to the Highland Park station on the Metro L Line light rail at Marmion Way between Aves. 57 and 58, one block from Figueroa Street.

See also
List of farmers' markets

External links
Market website
Current information on seasonal produce available at the market

Los Angeles
Economy of Los Angeles
Highland Park, Los Angeles